The 1948–49 season was Blackpool F.C.'s 41st season (38th consecutive) in the Football League. They competed in the 22-team Division One, then the top tier of English football, finishing sixteenth.

Stan Mortensen was the club's top scorer for the fifth consecutive season, with twenty goals (eighteen in the league and two in the FA Cup).

Table

Notes

References

Blackpool F.C.
Blackpool F.C. seasons